Shelby Ann Narito Rabara Shum (née Rabara; born October 5, 1983) is an American actress and dancer who has appeared in a number of films, television series and commercials as both an actress and a dancer. Rabara is known for providing the voice of Peridot for the Steven Universe franchise on Cartoon Network.

Early life 
Rabara was born in Orange County, California. She was raised by her mother in a single-parent household, along with her two siblings. She graduated with a degree in world arts and cultures from the University of California, Los Angeles in 2003.

Career
Rabara initially began her career as a dancer and was a member of the Laker Girls, the cheerleading squad of the Los Angeles Lakers basketball team. In 2005 she won a role at her very first audition, which was for the sitcom Grounded for Life. She said, in response to autistic fans of Peridot, the character she voices in Steven Universe and Steven Universe Future, that she was "happy that I can voice a character that gives people on the spectrum somebody to identify with."

Personal life
Rabara is of Filipino descent.

Rabara began a relationship with Costa Rican-born Chinese-American actor and dancer Harry Shum Jr. in 2007. The two became engaged in October 2013 while on vacation in Hawaii and were married on November 22, 2015, in Costa Rica. The birth of their daughter was announced on March 28, 2019.

Filmography

Live-action

Film

Television

Voice roles

Film

Television

References

External links
 
 

1983 births
Living people
21st-century American actresses
American film actresses
American voice actresses
American female dancers
21st-century American dancers
American actresses of Filipino descent
American dancers of Asian descent
UCLA School of the Arts and Architecture alumni